Home Again is the debut studio album by London-based singer-songwriter Michael Kiwanuka, which was released on 12 March 2012. It was produced by Paul Butler of the UK indie rock band The Bees in The Steam Rooms, a basement studio in his house in Ventnor on the Isle of Wight.

The album garnered a positive reception from critics. Home Again peaked at number 4 in the UK and spawned four singles: "Home Again", "I'm Getting Ready", "I'll Get Along" and "Bones". As of May 2012, the album has sold over 70,000 copies in the UK.

Singles
 "Home Again" was released as Kiwanuka's debut single on 1 January 2012. The song peaked to number 29 on the UK Singles Chart.
 "I'm Getting Ready" was released as the album's second single on 11 March 2012. The song peaked at number 187 on the UK Singles Chart.
 "I'll Get Along" was the third single from Home Again and was released on 28 May 2012.
 "Bones" was released as the album's fourth single on 24 September 2012.

Other releases
 "Tell Me a Tale" and "I'm Getting Ready" were both the title tracks of their parent EPs. Music videos were produced for both songs, in promotion of those EPs.

Critical reception

Home Again received positive reviews from music critics. At Metacritic, which assigns a normalized rating out of 100 to reviews from mainstream critics, the album received an average score of 72, based on 25 reviews.

Alexis Petredis of The Guardian gave high praise to Butler's production for capturing early '70s soul music and Kiwanuka's vocals and lyrics for feeling authentic, saying that, "Home Agains strength lies in the fact that it manages to tick a lot of boxes without sounding like it set out to tick a lot of boxes." Gareth James of Clash also praised Butler for his soft, acoustic production and compared Kiwanuka's vocals positively to Bill Withers, calling the album "an absolute treat for fans of rootsy vintage soul and a remarkable statement of intent for a debut release." Helen Brown of The Telegraph praised the production aesthetics for sounding complex and easy-going, saying that, "Despite its lyrical portrait of a constant worrier who feels lost and lonely, Home Again is a remarkably assured and sophisticated album." Hilary Saunders of Paste admired Kiwanuka's vocals and lyrics for resembling '70s soul artists like Otis Redding and Marvin Gaye, concluding with, "On Home Again, the young Kiwanuka proves that youth and wisdom are not mutually exclusive and his insights and talents, albeit still a bit raw, suggest great things to come."

Thom Jurek of AllMusic noted that Butler's vintage sounding production felt paint-by-numbers at times and Kiwanuka's lyrical content needed fine-tuning, concluding with, "Despite difficulties, Home Again is a promising debut by an artist who will no doubt deliver big if developed properly." Andy Gill of The Independent also found Kiwanuka's vocals and lyrics needing a bit more urgency and edge to them but called the album "a pleasant enough handful of easy-going songs, in which the focus on warmth has left them lacking bite." Emily Mackay of NME questioned the album's lack of gritty lyrics and false authenticity but said there were tracks that felt like genuine work, concluding that "Home Again provides a sumptuously soft place for tired ears to rest. Enough for many, for now, and a good start." Aaron Lavery of Drowned in Sound felt the album was depressing at times but said that "[I]t’s a minor quibble however, of a record that has clearly been crafted with great care and a terrific talent behind both the songwriting and the production."

Track listing

Personnel
Adapted from the Home Again booklet.

Performers and musicians
 Michael Kiwanuka – vocals ; acoustic guitar ; backing vocals ; bass ; claps and stomps ; electric guitar ; Rhodes piano 
 Paul Armfield – double bass 
 Paul Butler – backing vocals ; cello ; double bass ; drums ; Kora ; Moog ; percussion ; piano ; Rhodes piano ; saxophone ; sitar ; trumpet 
 Andy Parkin – violin 
 Tim Parkin – Rhodes piano , trumpet 
 Gary Plumley – flute ; saxophone 

Technical
 Paul Butler – mixing, production
 Guy Davie – mastering
 Jon McMullen – engineering
 Robin Schmidt – mastering 

Artwork
 Benjamin Etridge – photography
 Markus Karlsson – art direction, design
 Gerard Saint – art direction

Charts

Weekly charts

Year-end charts

Sales and certifications

Release history

References

2012 debut albums
Michael Kiwanuka albums
Interscope Records albums
London Records albums
Polydor Records albums
Interscope Geffen A&M Records albums